There are 26 government ministries in Afghanistan.

Ministry of Agriculture, Irrigation and Livestock
Minister of Commerce and Industry
Ministry of Communications and Information Technology
Ministry of Counter Narcotics
Ministry of Defense
National Disaster Management Authority
Ministry of Economy
Ministry of Education
Ministry of Energy and Water
Ministry of Finance
Ministry of Foreign Affairs
Ministry of Frontiers, Nations and Tribal Affairs
Ministry of Hajj and Religious Affairs
Ministry of Labor, Social Affairs, Martyrs, and Disabled 
Ministry of Higher Education
Ministry of Information and Culture
Ministry of Interior Affairs
Ministry of Justice
Ministry of Mines 
Ministry for the Propagation of Virtue and the Prevention of Vice
Ministry of Public Health
Ministry of Public Works 
 Ministry of Refugees
Ministry of Rural Rehabilitation and Development
Ministry of Transport and Civil Aviation
Ministry of Urban Development and Housing

References